Juan Francisco Cornejo Palma (born 27 February 1990) is a Chilean footballer who currently plays for Coquimbo Unido in the Primera División de Chile as a left back.

Career
On January 14, 2017 Cornejo made his Liga MX debut against Club Necaxa playing the last 3 minutes of the 1-0 win.

In December 2022, he signed with Coquimbo Unido for the 2023 season.

International career
He was named in the preliminary squad for the 2015 Copa America but was omitted from the final squad.

Honours

Club
Universidad Católica
 Primera División de Chile (3): 2019, 2020, 2021
 Supercopa de Chile (3): 2019, 2020, 2021

References

External links
 Juan Cornejo at Audax Italiano
 
 
 

1990 births
Living people
People from Cachapoal Province
Chilean footballers
Chilean expatriate footballers
Chile international footballers
Deportes Magallanes footballers
Magallanes footballers
Audax Italiano footballers
Club León footballers
Club Deportivo Universidad Católica footballers
C.D. Antofagasta footballers
Coquimbo Unido footballers
Tercera División de Chile players 
Primera B de Chile players
Chilean Primera División players
Liga MX players
Chilean expatriate sportspeople in Mexico
Expatriate footballers in Mexico
Association football fullbacks